Frantsevo (Францево) is a village in the Pervomaysky District, Tomsk Oblast. It is part of the Komsomolsk selo.

History 
The village was historically served by the Komsomol Narrow Gauge Rail, until its destruction by the logging company that owned it in 2015.

Population 
In 2015, its population was reported at 97 people, down from 104 in 2012.

References 

Rural localities in Tomsk Oblast